Yakir is an Israeli settlement in the West Bank,  southwest of the Palestinian city of Nablus, near Revava and Nofim, on Road 5066, roughly between Barkan and Karnei Shomron. Organised as a community settlement founded in February 1981 on lands that the Israeli government expropriated from the nearby Palestinian village of Deir Istiya, it sits at 420 metres above sea level and is under the jurisdiction of Shomron Regional Council.

The international community considers Israeli settlements in the West Bank illegal under international law, but the Israeli government disputes this.

Etymology
The name is taken from a passage in the Book of Jeremiah (31:20) 'Is Ephraim a darling (yakir) son unto Me?'"

History
According to ARIJ, Israel confiscated 659 dunams of land from the nearby Palestinian village of Deir Istiya in order to construct Yakir.

The settlement was established in 1981. As of 2013, the property was being developed to accommodate a growing need for housing in the town.

In March 2013, the Biton's family car was attacked, near neighboring village of Kif el-Hares, with stones which caused it to get out of control and collide with a truck. Adele Biton was critically injured along with her mother and two sisters who were moderately injured. After almost two years in different hospitals and home care, she died on February 17, 2015.

References

External links
Menachem Brody's photos of Yakir 

Religious Israeli settlements
Populated places established in 1981
1981 establishments in the Israeli Military Governorate

Israeli settlements in the West Bank